Cobanus is a genus of jumping spiders that was first described by Frederick Octavius Pickard-Cambridge in 1900.

Species 
 it contains eight species found in South America:

 Cobanus bifurcatus Chickering, 1946 – Panama
 Cobanus cambridgei Chickering, 1946 – Panama
 Cobanus chocquibtown Cala-Riquelme, Bustamante & Salgado, 2022 – Colombia
 Cobanus electus Chickering, 1946 – Panama
 Cobanus extensus (G. W. Peckham & E. G. Peckham, 1896) – Panama
 Cobanus mandibularis (G. W. Peckham & E. G. Peckham, 1896) – Panama, Colombia
 Cobanus muelona Cala-Riquelme, Bustamante & Salgado, 2022 – Colombia
 Cobanus unicolor F. O. Pickard-Cambridge, 1900 – Costa Rica, Panama

References

Salticidae
Spiders of Central America
Spiders of South America
Taxa named by Frederick Octavius Pickard-Cambridge